The Sonoran Desert is a desert in North America and ecoregion that covers the northwestern Mexican states of Sonora, Baja California, and Baja California Sur, as well as part of the southwestern United States (in Arizona and California). It is the hottest desert in both Mexico and the United States.

In phytogeography, the Sonoran Desert is within the Sonoran Floristic province of the Madrean Region of southwestern North America, part of the Holarctic realm of the northern Western Hemisphere. The desert contains a variety of unique endemic plants and animals, notably, the saguaro (Carnegiea gigantea) and organ pipe cactus (Stenocereus thurberi).

The Sonoran Desert is clearly distinct from nearby deserts (e.g., the Great Basin, Mojave, and Chihuahuan deserts) because it provides subtropical warmth in winter and two seasons of rainfall (in contrast, for example, to the Mojave's dry summers and cold winters). This creates an extreme contrast between aridity and moisture.

Location
The Sonoran desert wraps around the northern end of the Gulf of California, from Baja California Sur (El Vizcaíno Biosphere Reserve in central and Pacific west coast, Central Gulf Coast subregion on east to southern tip), north through much of Baja California, excluding the central northwest mountains and Pacific west coast, through southeastern California and southwestern and southern Arizona to western and central parts of Sonora.

It is bounded on the west by the Peninsular Ranges, which separate it from the California chaparral and woodlands (northwest) and Baja California Desert (Vizcaino subregion, central and southeast) ecoregions of the Pacific slope. The Gulf of California xeric scrub ecoregion lies south of the Sonoran desert on the Gulf of California slope of the Baja California Peninsula.

To the north in California and northwest Arizona, the Sonoran Desert transitions to the colder-winter, higher-elevation Mojave, Great Basin, and Colorado Plateau deserts.

The coniferous Arizona Mountains forests are to the northeast. The Chihuahuan Desert and Sierra Madre Occidental pine–oak forests are at higher elevations to the east. To the south the Sonoran–Sinaloan transition subtropical dry forest is the transition zone from the Sonoran Desert to the tropical dry forests of the Mexican state of Sinaloa.

Sub-regions
The desert's sub-regions include the Colorado Desert of southeastern California; and the Yuma Desert east of the north-to-south section of the Colorado River in southwest Arizona. In the 1957 publication Vegetation of the Sonoran Desert, Forrest Shreve divided the Sonoran Desert into seven regions according to characteristic vegetation: Lower Colorado Valley, Arizona Upland, Plains of Sonora, Foothills of Sonora, Central Gulf Coast, Vizcaíno Region, and Magdalena Region. Many ecologists consider Shreve's Vizcaíno and Magdalena regions, which lie on the western side of the Baja California Peninsula, to be a separate ecoregion, the Baja California Desert.

Within the southern Sonoran Desert in Mexico is found the Gran Desierto de Altar, with the El Pinacate y Gran Desierto de Altar Biosphere Reserve, extending  of desert and mountainous regions. The biosphere reserve includes the only active erg dune region in North America. The nearest city to the biosphere reserve is Puerto Peñasco ('Rocky Point') in the state of Sonora, Mexico.

Sub-regions
Sonoran Desert sub-regions include:
 Colorado Desert
 Gran Desierto de Altar
 Lechuguilla Desert
 Tonopah Desert
 Yuha Desert
 Yuma Desert

Climate
The Sonoran desert has an arid subtropical climate. In the lower-elevation portions of the desert, temperatures are warm year-round, and rainfall is infrequent and irregular, often less than 90 mm (approx. 3.5”) annually. The Arizona uplands are also warm year-round, but they receive 100–300 mm (approx. 4-12”) of average annual rainfall, which falls in a more regular bi-seasonal pattern.

Flora

Many plants not only survive, but thrive in the harsh conditions of the Sonoran Desert. Many have evolved to have specialized adaptations to the desert climate. The Sonoran Desert's bi-seasonal rainfall pattern results in more plant species than any other desert in the world. The Sonoran Desert includes  plant genera and species from the agave family, palm family, cactus family, legume family, and numerous others.

The Sonoran is the only place in the world where the famous saguaro cactus  (Carnegiea gigantea) grows in the wild. Cholla (Cylindropuntia spp.), beavertail (Opuntia basilaris), hedgehog (Echinocereus spp.), fishhook (Ferocactus wislizeni), prickly pear (Opuntia spp.), nightblooming cereus (Peniocereus spp.), and organ pipe (Stenocereus thurberi) are other taxa of cacti found here. Cactus provides food and homes to many desert mammals and birds, with showy flowers in reds, pinks, yellows, and whites, blooming most commonly from late March through June, depending on the species and seasonal temperatures.

Creosote bush (Larrea tridentata) and bur sage (Ambrosia dumosa) dominate valley floors. Indigo bush (Psorothamnus fremontii) and Mormon tea are other shrubs that may be found. Wildflowers of the Sonoran Desert include desert sand verbena (Abronia villosa), desert sunflower (Geraea canescens), and evening primroses.

Ascending from the valley up bajadas, various subtrees such as velvet mesquite (Prosopis velutina), palo verde (Parkinsonia florida), desert ironwood (Olneya tesota), desert willow (Chilopsis linearis ssp. arcuata), and crucifixion thorn (Canotia holacantha) are common, as well as multi-stemmed ocotillo (Fouquieria splendens). Shrubs found at higher elevations include whitethorn acacia (Acacia constricta), fairy duster, and jojoba. In the desert subdivisions found on Baja California, cardon cactus, elephant tree, and boojum tree occur.

The California fan palm (Washingtonia filifera) is found in the Colorado Desert section of the Sonoran Desert, the only native palm in California, among many other introduced Arecaceae genera and species. It is found at spring-fed oases, such as in Anza Borrego Desert State Park, Joshua Tree National Park, and the Kofa National Wildlife Refuge.

Fauna

The Sonoran Desert is home to a wide variety of animals, birds and other creatures. such as the Gila monster, bobcat, mule deer, antelope jackrabbit, burrowing owl, greater roadrunner, western diamondback rattlesnake, and elf owl. There are three hundred fifty bird species, 20 amphibian species, over 100 reptile species, 30 native fish species, over 1000 native bee species, and more than 2,000 native plant species found in the desert area. The Sonoran Desert area southeast of Tucson and near the Mexican border is vital habitat for the only population of jaguars living within the United States.  The Colorado River Delta was once an ecological hotspot within the Sonoran desert due to the Colorado river in this otherwise dry area, but the delta has been greatly reduced in extent due to the damming and use of the river upstream. Species that have higher heat tolerance are able to thrive in the conditions of the Sonoran Desert. One such insect species that has evolved a means to thrive in this environment is Drosophila mettleri, a Sonoran Desert fly. This fly contains a specialized P450 detoxification system that enables it to nest in the cool region of exudate moistened soil. Thus, the fly is one of few that can tolerate the high desert temperatures and successfully reproduce.

Human population

The Sonoran Desert is home to the cultures of over 17 contemporary Native American tribes, with settlements at  American Indian reservations in California and Arizona, as well as populations in Mexico.

The largest city in the Sonoran Desert is Phoenix, Arizona, with a 2017 metropolitan population of about 4.7 million. Located on the Salt River in central Arizona, it is one of the fastest-growing metropolitan areas in the United States.

The next largest cities are Tucson, in southern Arizona, with a metro area population of just over 1 million, and Mexicali, Baja California, with a similarly sized metropolitan population of around 1,000,000. The metropolitan area of Hermosillo, Sonora, has a population close to 900,000. Ciudad Obregón, Sonora, in the southern part of the desert, has a population of 375,800.

California
The Coachella Valley, located in the Colorado Desert section of the Sonoran Desert, has a population of 365,000. Several famous Southern California desert resort cities such as Palm Springs and Palm Desert are located here.

During the winter months, from November to April, the daytime temperatures in the Coachella Valley range from 70 °F (21 °C) to 90 °F (32 °C) and corresponding nighttime lows range from 46 °F (8 °C) to 68 °F (20 °C) making it a popular winter resort destination. Due to its warm year-round climate citrus and subtropical fruits such as mangoes, figs, and dates are grown in the Coachella Valley and adjacent Imperial Valley. The Imperial Valley has a total population of over 180,000 and has a similar climate to that of the Coachella Valley. Other cities include Borrego Springs, Indio, Coachella, Calexico, El Centro, Imperial, and Blythe.

United States–Mexico border region

Straddling the Mexico–United States border with low levels of human-installed security, the Sonoran desert is a route for unauthorized entry across the border. The harsh conditions mean that the 3-to-5-day march, usually moving at night to minimize exposure to the heat, sometimes results in death.

Protected areas

There are many National Parks and Monuments; federal and state nature reserves and wildlife refuges; state, county, and city parks; and government or nonprofit group operated natural history museums, science research institutes, and botanical gardens and desert landscape gardens.
 Index: Protected areas of the Sonoran Desert
 Index: Protected areas of the Colorado Desert
Sonoran Desert protected areas include

 Arizona–Sonora Desert Museum
 Sonoran Desert National Monument  
 Boyce Thompson Arboretum State Park – Sonoran Desert flora arboretum
 Anza–Borrego Desert State Park
 Organ Pipe Cactus National Monument
 Saguaro National Park
 Joshua Tree National Park
 Reserva de la Biosfera el Pinacate y Gran Desierto de Altar – Pinacate National Park, in Sonora, Mexico
 Indio Hills Palms State Reserve
 Coachella Valley National Wildlife Refuge
 Cabeza Prieta National Wildlife Refuge
 Kofa National Wildlife Refuge
 South Mountain Park
 Sonoran Arthropod Studies Institute

See also

 Chihuahuan Desert
 Dust storm
 List of deserts by area
 List of ecoregions in the United States (EPA) (the Sonoran Basin and Range is item 81 on the map)
 List of ecoregions in the United States (WWF)
 Mojave Desert
 Spanish missions in the Sonoran Desert
 :Category:Mountain ranges of the Sonoran Desert

References

External links

 Arizona–Sonora Desert Museum
 Map of the Sonoran Desert Ecoregion
 Sonoran Desert and its subdivisions – with photos.
 Timeline of the Sonoran desert
 An Overview of the Sonoran Desert, by William G. McGinnies
 The Sonoran Desert Naturalist
 Very short overview of Sonoran Desert Geology
 Sonoran Desert images at bioimages.vanderbilt.edu (slow modem version)
 International Sonoran Desert Alliance
 Sounds of the Sonoran Desert)

Parks and recreation areas
 Sonoran Desert National Monument: official website
 Saguaro National Park: official website
 Anza–Borrego Desert State: official website
 Organ Pipe Cactus National Monument: official website
 Joshua Tree National Park: official website
 South Mountain Park – Preserve
 Arizona State Parks: official website (desert plants)

 
Basin and Range Province
Deserts and xeric shrublands in the United States
Deserts and xeric shrublands
Deserts of Arizona
Deserts of California
Deserts of Mexico
Deserts of North America
Deserts of the Lower Colorado River Valley
Ecoregions of Mexico
Ecoregions of the United States
Floristic provinces
Geography of Southern California
Geologic provinces of California
Gulf of California
Madrean Region
Physiographic sections
Physiographic regions of Mexico
Physiographic regions of the United States
Desert, Sonoran
Nearctic ecoregions